Fredrik Sonntag is a Swedish professional ice hockey defenceman who currently plays for Timrå IK of the Elitserien.

References

External links

1987 births
Living people
Timrå IK players
Swedish ice hockey defencemen